People associated with the campaign for Scottish devolution, also referred to as Home Rule; for example signatories of the Claim of Right for Scotland.

See also 
 Scottish Home Rule Association 
 Scottish Labour Party (1888) 
 Scottish Covenant Association
 Campaign for a Scottish Assembly
 Scottish Constitutional Convention
 Scottish Labour Action
 Scotland United
 Scotland Forward

Devolution
People
Scottish devolution
Scottish devolution
Scottish devolution
Devolution
Devolution
Scottish devolution
Devolution campaign